The Undisputed British Cruiserweight Championship is a professional wrestling championship owned by the Revolution Pro Wrestling (RevPro/RPW) promotion. The title was created and debuted on 6 December 2008. The inaugural champion was Mark Haskins. The current champion is Robbie X, who is in his first reign.

Title history
Mark Haskins was the inaugural champion. Josh Bodom has the most reigns at three and also served as the interim champion in early-2017 while until reigning lineal champion Will Ospreay returned from Japan (this is not counted as one of Bodom's three reigns). Michael Oku's reign is the longest at 890 days, while Andrew Everett's reign is the shortest at 2 days.

Robbie X is the current champion in his first reign. He defeated Luke Jacobs for the title on Uprising on 17 December 2022, in London, England.

Reign

Combined reigns

See also

Professional wrestling in the United Kingdom
RPW British Heavyweight Championship
RPW Undisputed British Tag Team Championship

References

External links
 RPW British Cruiserweight Title History at Cagematch.net

Revolution Pro Wrestling championships
International Pro Wrestling: United Kingdom championships
Cruiserweight wrestling championships
National professional wrestling championships
Professional wrestling in the United Kingdom